The CMC Leopard was a British light personal business jet developed in the 1980s. Two prototypes were built and flown, but the type was never put into production.

Design and development
The Leopard was a twin-jet, mid-wing monoplane of composite construction with all-swept flying surfaces and jet fighter-like styling, apart from the podded engines, mounted on each side of the rear fuselage. The entire canopy hinged forward to allow access to the four reclining seats.

A mockup was completed in 1982, leading to a prototype (registration ) built by the Designability company.  The prototype first flew late in 1988. Development suffered a major setback when the engine manufacturer, Noel Penny Turbines, ceased business, leading to the grounding of the prototype. A second, refined prototype (registration ) was then constructed to use Williams International turbofans. This aircraft also incorporated a pressurised cabin, revised undercarriage, and a generally strengthened airframe. This second prototype was unveiled at the 1996 Farnborough International Airshow and first flew on 9 April 1997.

The project never progressed beyond the two aircraft built, later redesignated Leopard Four to distinguish them from a six-seat variant proposed in 2001, the Leopard Six. The EJ22 engine could no longer be used due to exclusive deal between Williams and Eclipse, resulting in the Six being proposed to make use of the larger FJ33. Chief aircraft designer and CMC chairman Ian Chichester-Miles died in 2009, bringing the enterprise to an end.

Aircraft on display

Until 2007, both prototype Leopards, G-BKRL and G-BRNM, were on display at the Bournemouth Aviation Museum. With the museum temporary closure and relocation in 2008, only the former was retained and moved to the new site, while G-BRNM was acquired by the Midland Air Museum at Coventry Airport.

Specifications (second prototype)

References

 
 

Chichester-Miles aircraft
1980s British business aircraft
Abandoned civil aircraft projects of the United Kingdom
Twinjets
Mid-wing aircraft
Aircraft first flown in 1988